The New Zealand cricket team toured India in October and November 2017 to play three One Day Internationals (ODIs) and three Twenty20 International (T20I) matches. The fixtures replaced the planned visit to India by Pakistan that was listed on the Future Tours Programme. The Board of Control for Cricket in India (BCCI) confirmed the full dates in September 2017. On 25 September 2017, New Zealand named the first nine players for the ODI squad. The remaining players for New Zealand's ODI and T20I squads were named on 14 October 2017.

Ahead of the second ODI, footage emerged of groundsman Pandurang Salgaonkar allegedly agreeing to tamper with the wicket. He was later suspended by the Maharashtra Cricket Association, with the match going ahead as scheduled.

India won the ODI series 2–1 and the T20I series 2–1.

Squads

Ahead of the tour, Todd Astle was ruled out of both New Zealand's ODI and T20I squads. Ish Sodhi replaced him in the ODI squad and Ross Taylor replaced him in the T20I squad.

Tour matches

1st One-day: India Board President XI vs New Zealand

2nd One-day: India Board President XI vs New Zealand

ODI Series

1st ODI

2nd ODI

3rd ODI

T20I series

1st T20I

2nd T20I

3rd T20I

References

External links
 Series home at ESPN Cricinfo

2017 in Australian cricket
2017 in New Zealand cricket
International cricket competitions in 2017–18
New Zealand cricket tours of India